Down in 'Arkansaw' is a 1938 American comedy film directed by Nick Grinde and written by Dorrell McGowan and Stuart E. McGowan. The film stars Ralph Byrd with the vaudeville comedy troupe the Weaver Brothers and Elviry, along with June Storey and Pinky Tomlin. The film was released on October 8, 1938, by Republic Pictures.

Plot

Cast 
Ralph Byrd as John Parker
Leon Weaver as Abner Weaver
June Weaver as Elviry Weaver 
Frank Weaver as Cicero Weaver
June Storey as Mary Weaver
Pinky Tomlin as Pinky
Berton Churchill as Judge
Guinn "Big Boy" Williams as Juble Butler 
Walter Miller as Marks
Gertrude Green as Elsie
Selmer Jackson as Edwards
Arthur Loft as Turner 
Ivan Miller as Lewis
John Dilson as Graves
Al Bridge as Jake 
Karl Hackett as Wilkins

References

External links
 

1938 films
1930s English-language films
American comedy films
1938 comedy films
Republic Pictures films
Films directed by Nick Grinde
American black-and-white films
1930s American films